Palizan Rural District is a rural district (dehestan) in the Central District of Maraveh Tappeh County, Golestan Province, Iran. At the 2006 census, its population was 492, in 107 families.  The rural district has 3 villages.

References 

Rural Districts of Golestan Province
Maraveh Tappeh County